Ela Cheppanu (English translation: How Should I Say?) is a 2003 Indian Telugu-language film starring Tharun, Shriya Saran, and  Vijayachander. The film was directed by B.V. Ramana. It is the remake of the Bollywood film Tum Bin.

Plot

After Amar Varma's accidental death in India, Germany-based Varma Industries is on the verge of collapse. Priya, Amar's fiancée, is devastated, Amar's dad is in shock and unresponsive towards others while Amar's sister and grandmother are in mourning. Inspector who is investigating the case is determined to find the person responsible for the accident despite his superiors' indifference towards the case.

Months after Amar's death, a highly respected and talented business worker named Sekhar offers to re-build and restore Varma Industries without any compensation, stating Amar met him in India and offered him a job before his death. He is given the chance and goes about the uphill task of making the company viable again. Gradually, Sekhar heals the gaping wound left in the Varma family by Amar's death and they come to accept him as one of the family. What they don't know — except for Sunil, Sekhar's friend in Germany — is that it was Sekhar's jeep that accidentally had hit Amar after he swerved to avoid hitting an innocent girl who had walked into the road, causing his death. Ridden by guilt Sekhar came to Germany to confess, ask for forgiveness, and do whatever he can for the family.

Abhi is a wealthy Germany industrialist who meets Priya and realizes that she is the right woman for him. He is considering proposing to Priya and helping to rebuild Varma Industries. But Priya has fallen in love with Sekhar. Eventually, a conflict arises between Priya and Sekhar regarding a proposition made by Abhi to take over Varma Industries. Sekhar realizes that Priya does not need his help anymore and decides to return to India.

Priya stops Sekhar while he boards his flight and confesses her feelings for him. Sekhar denies his feelings and boards the plane. Devastated, Priya goes home and gets engaged to Abhi. At the airport arrives inspector, from India in search of the person who killed Amar, and arrests Sekhar. They wait, with Sunil, to board the next flight to India. Sekhar calls Priya and tells her how much he loves her and confesses that it was he who hit her fiancé. While talking to Priya, Shekhar meets with an accident.

Priya feels guilty about falling for the man who caused Amar's death and confesses it to Amar's father, who surprises her by speaking for the first time after his son's death. He tells her that Sekhar had told him the truth when he first visited them and he believes Sekhar. Amar's family then makes Priya realize how much Sekhar has done for the family and that he is like Amar to them. Sunil informs them about Sekhar's accident. Abhi tells a skeptical Priya to go back to Sekhar as he is her true love. Meanwhile, Inspector who is in the hospital with everyone, understands that the family needs Sekhar more than the law does and simply closes the case and leaves. The movie ends with Sekhar recovering and uniting with Priya while Abhi is left devastated and is comforted by his uncle.

Cast
 Tarun as Sekhar
 Shriya as Priya
 Vijayachander as Amar's father
 Siva Balaji as Amar Varma
 Sunil as Sunil
 Tanikella Bharani as Police Inspector 
 Brahmanandam as Brahmaji
 Abhi as Abhiram
 Giri Babu as James, Abhiram's uncle
 Sowcar Janaki as Amar's grandmother
 Kovai Sarala as Sarala
 Gundu Sudarshan as Buchi Babu
 Hanish
 Suhani Kalita as Mili, Amar's sister
 Ruthika in a special appearance

Soundtrack

The music and background score was composed by Koti. The soundtrack album consisted of 8 tracks .  The song "Ee Kshanam " sung by K.S.Chitra became an evergreen song topping the charts, "Prati Nijam", "Maaghamaasa Vella", "Aa Navvulo" & "Manninchu Oo Prema" were other hits from the album. All the lyrics were written by Sirivennela Sitarama Sastry.

References

External links
 

2000s Telugu-language films
2003 films
Telugu remakes of Hindi films
Films scored by Koti
Films set in Germany